Vítor Manuel Santos Bastos (born 1 May 1990) is a Portuguese footballer who plays for CF Canelas 2010 as a centre-back.

Club career
Born in the village of Gondar in Guimarães, Bastos appeared in one Primeira Liga during his spell with local club Vitória Sport Clube, the 2–0 away loss against Sporting CP on 30 November 2008 where he played the first 45 minutes as a last-year junior. He went on to serve three consecutive loan spells, with F.C. Vizela in the third division and S.C. Freamunde and Atlético Clube de Portugal in the Segunda Liga.

Returned to his parent club for 2012–13, Bastos was assigned to the reserves in the second tier. After his release in March 2013 he represented S.C. Olhanense, being sparingly used and being relegated from the top flight in his first season. In January 2015, he left the Algarve and signed a one-and-a-half-year contract with NK Istra 1961 from the Croatian First Football League.

In the summer of 2015, Bastos joined French Ligue 2 team Red Star F.C. alongside compatriot Rui Sampaio. His competitive input consisted of the 5–1 league home defeat to Valenciennes FC on 28 August.

International career
Bastos collected 18 caps for Portugal at youth level. He made his debut for the under-21s on 28 March 2011, playing the entire 1–1 friendly draw with Denmark at the Estádio Municipal Sérgio Conceição.

References

External links

1990 births
Living people
Sportspeople from Guimarães
Portuguese footballers
Association football defenders
Primeira Liga players
Liga Portugal 2 players
Segunda Divisão players
Vitória S.C. players
F.C. Vizela players
S.C. Freamunde players
Atlético Clube de Portugal players
Vitória S.C. B players
S.C. Olhanense players
A.D. Sanjoanense players
AD Oliveirense players
Croatian Football League players
NK Istra 1961 players
Ligue 2 players
Red Star F.C. players
Portugal youth international footballers
Portugal under-21 international footballers
Portuguese expatriate footballers
Expatriate footballers in Croatia
Expatriate footballers in France
Portuguese expatriate sportspeople in Croatia
Portuguese expatriate sportspeople in France